The Portella della Ginestra massacre was one of the most violent acts in the history of modern Italian politics, when 11 people were killed and 27 wounded during May Day celebrations in Sicily on 1 May 1947, in the municipality of Piana degli Albanesi. Those held responsible were the bandit and separatist leader Salvatore Giuliano and his gang, although their motives and intentions are still a matter of controversy.

Preceding events
From May 1893, during the period of the Fasci Siciliani, the peasants of the neighbouring towns of Piana degli Albanesi, San Giuseppe Jato and San Cipirello used to gather at Portella della Ginestra for the Labour Day celebrations at the initiative of the physician and peasant leader Nicola Barbato, who used to speak to the crowd from a big rock that was later called "Barbato's Stone". The tradition was interrupted during the Fascist period and resumed after the fall of the Fascist regime.

The massacre took place twelve days after a surprise victory by the People's Block (Blocco del popolo) – a coalition of the Italian Communist Party (Partito Comunista Italiano, PCI) and the Italian Socialist Party (Partito Socialista Italiano, PSI) – in the elections for the Constituent Assembly of the autonomous region of Sicily on April 20–21, 1947. The People's Block obtained 29.13 percent of the vote, while the Christian Democrat Party got 20.52% and the Common Man's Front and Monarchist National Party came third and fourth.

With national elections set for October 1947, the leftist victory in Sicily created speculation that a coalition led by Palmiro Togliatti might bring Italy under communist rule. In Sicily, the leader of the Sicilian branch of the communists, Girolamo Li Causi, pledged to redistribute large land holdings, but to preserve any sized 100 hectares (247 acres) or less.

The massacre

On 1 May 1947, hundreds of mostly poor peasants gathered at Portella della Ginestra, three kilometers from the town of Piana degli Albanesi on the way to San Giuseppe Jato for the traditional international Labour Day parade. At 10:15, the Communist party secretary from Piana degli Albanesi began to address the crowd when gunfire broke out. It was later determined that machine guns had been fired from the surrounding hills, as well as by men on horseback. Eleven people were killed, including four children, Serafino Lascari (15), Giovanni Grifò (12), Giuseppe Di Maggio (13) and Vincenza La Fata (8). Twenty-seven people were wounded, including a little girl who had her jaw shot off.

The attack was attributed to the bandit and separatist leader Salvatore Giuliano. His aim had been to punish local leftists for the recent election results. In an open letter he took sole responsibility for the murders and claimed that he had only wanted his men to fire above the heads of the crowd; the deaths had been a mistake.

Until the massacre, Giuliano had been regarded by many as a modern-day Robin Hood who stole from (and even kidnapped) wealthy Sicilians to help the impoverished Sicilians. The shooting of children and peasants at Ginestra, however, outraged his former admirers, and a bounty of three million lire ($13,200 in 1947, $150,000 in 2019) was offered by the Italian government for Giuliano's capture.

The massacre created a national scandal. The Communist-controlled Italian General Confederation of Labour called a general strike in protest against the massacre. According to newspaper reports hints at the possibility of civil war were heard as Communist leaders harangued meetings of 6,000,000 workers who struck throughout Italy in protest against the May Day massacre in Sicily.

The Minister of the Interior, the Christian Democrat Mario Scelba, reported to Parliament the next day that so far as the police could determine, the Portella della Ginestra shooting was non-political. Bandits notoriously infested the valley in which it occurred, said Scelba. Li Causi disagreed and charged that the Mafia had perpetrated the attack, in cahoots with the large landowners, monarchists and the rightist Common Man's Front. The debate ended in a fist fight between the left and the right. Nearly 200 deputies took part in the brawl.

The victims
Source:
Margherita Clesceri (37 years old)
Giorgio Cusenza (42)
Giovanni Megna (18)
Francesco Vicari (22)
Vito Allotta (19)
Serafino Lascari (15)
Filippo Di Salvo (48)
Giuseppe Di Maggio (13)
Castrense Intravaia (18)
Giovanni Grifò (12)
Vincenza La Fata (8)

Denouncing the massacre

Li Causi and Scelba would be the main opponents in the aftermath of the massacre and the successive killing of the suspected perpetrator Giuliano, and the trial against Giuliano's lieutenant Gaspare Pisciotta and other remaining members of Giuliano's gang. While Scelba dismissed any political motive, Li Causi stressed the political nature of the massacre – and tried to uncover the truth. Li Causi claimed that the police inspector Ettore Messana – supposed to coordinate the persecution of the bandits – had been in league with Giuliano and denounced Scelba for allowing Messana to remain in office. Later documents would prove the accusation.

Li Causi suspected a campaign against the left and linked it with the crisis in the national government (under Prime Minister Alcide De Gasperi), which would lead to the expulsion of the communists and socialist from government, as well as to prevent the left from entering the regional government. On 30 May 1947, Giuseppe Alessi, became the first president of the Sicilian region with the support of the centre right and the same day De Gasperi announced his new centrist government, who had been in the national union governments since 1945.

Challenging Giuliano

Speaking at Portella della Ginestra on the second anniversary of the massacre, Li Causi publicly called on Giuliano to name names. He received a written reply from the bandit leader:

Li Causi responded by reminding Giuliano that he would almost certainly be betrayed: "Don't you understand that Scelba will have you killed." Giuliano again replied, hinting at the powerful secrets that he possessed:

Salvatore Giuliano was killed on 5 July 1950, when the hearings for the trial against Giuliano's captured associates started in Viterbo, near Rome. He always denied that there had been anyone behind him who had ordered the killing. However, his lieutenant Pisciotta and other witnesses claimed that a few days before the massacre, on April 27, 1947, Giuliano had received a letter, which he destroyed immediately after reading it. He told his gang: "Boys, the hour of our liberation is at hand." According to the witnesses, the letter demanded the massacre at Portella della Ginestra in exchange for liberty for all of the gang.

Viterbo trial
The trial against the perpetrators for the massacre started in the summer of 1950 in Viterbo. Scelba was again said to have been involved in the plot to carry out the massacre, but the accusations were often contradictionary or vague. In the end the judge concluded that no higher authority had ordered the massacre, and that the Giuliano band had acted autonomously. At the Viterbo trial Pisciotta said:

Pisciotta also claimed that he had killed the bandit Salvatore Giuliano in his sleep by arrangement with Scelba. However, there was no evidence that Scelba had had any relationship with Pisciotta.

At the trial for the Portella della Ginestra massacre, Gaspare Pisciotta said:

Witnesses disappear

Pisciotta was sentenced to life in imprisonment and forced labour; most of the other 70 bandits met the same fate. Others were at large, but one by one they all disappeared. Pisciotta probably was the only one who could reveal the truth behind the massacre. While he was in Giuliano's band, he carried a pass signed by a colonel of the Carabinieri that allowed him to move freely about the island. At the trial he declared, "We are one body: bandits, police and Mafia – like the Father, the Son and the Holy Spirit."

While serving his sentence he wrote his autobiography awaiting a new trial at which he would be charged with killing Giuliano. Some authorities were beginning to take his evidence more seriously, and perjury and other charges were made against police and Carabinieri. Pisciotta realised that he had been abandoned and was threatening to reveal much more than at the first trial, in particular who signed the letter which had been brought to Giuliano just before the attack. On 9 February 1954, he took a cup of coffee with what he thought was a tuberculosis medicine. Instead someone had replaced it with strychnine. Within an hour he was dead and his autobiography disappeared.

The massacre created a national scandal, which ended in 1956 with the conviction of the remaining members of Giuliano's gang. It still remains a highly controversial topic. The finger of blame has been pointed at numerous sources, including the Italian government. Leftists who were the victims of the attack have blamed the landed barons and the Mafia; significantly, the memorial plaque erected by them makes no mention of Giuliano or his band:

Theories
While some historians see the massacre as a conspiracy of the Mafia, anti-communist political forces – the Christian-Democratic party in particular – and American intelligence services in the wake of the Cold War, others consider the bloodbath as the culmination of local struggles for land rights and land reform in the area of Piana degli Albanesi and San Giuseppe Jato. Just as at the end of World War I, the post-war period saw an increase of violence between landowners backed by the Mafia and left-wing peasant movements. A few weeks before the massacre, the local Mafia boss of Piana, Francesco Cuccia, and others had asked landowners for money to "put an end to the communists once and for all." They made clear that they were ready to go beyond the traditional acts of Mafia violence that had been used against the socialist peasant movement before the rise of fascism in the early 1920s when six socialist militants had been killed in Piana.

"Without the consent of the Mafia in Piana degli Albanesi, San Giuseppe Jato and San Cipirello, Giuliano could not have shot at Portella della Ginestra," according to the historian Francesco Renda. Renda, among others, was an eyewitness of the massacre. That May morning he was supposed to speak at Portella. "But I got a bit late and before my eyes this horrific tragedy happened." Renda recalls that immediately after the massacre, the peasants of Piana wanted their own justice, threatening to kill the mafiosi of their county. "I convinced them," Renda remembered, "that that would have been the provocation needed to outlaw the Communists."

In the arts

Film depictions
Salvatore Giuliano is a 1962 Italian film directed by Francesco Rosi. Shot in a neo-realist documentary, non-linear style, it follows the lives of those involved with Giuliano. When Rosi came to Sicily in 1961 to re-enact the Portella Della Ginestra sequence massacre for the film, the trauma from 14 years earlier was still fresh. He asked 1,000 peasants to go back and enact exactly what they, their friends and relatives had been through. Events nearly slipped out of control. When the gunfire sound effects started, the crowd panicked and knocked over one of the cameras in rush to escape; women wept and knelt in prayer; men threw themselves to the ground in agony. One old woman, dressed entirely in black, planted herself before the camera and repeated in an anguished wail, "Where are my children?" Two of her sons had died at the hands of Giuliano and his gang.

A deleted scene from The Godfather is an allusion to the events and to Mario Puzo's novel The Sicilian. The scene takes place during Michael Corleone's exile in Sicily. He and his companions witness a parade of communist marchers headed to Portella delle Ginestre and singing Bandiera Rossa.

Michael Cimino's 1987 version, a film adaptation of Mario Puzo's The Sicilian, was filmed instead at Sutera and Caltanissetta.

The massacre was also depicted in 2009 in Giuseppe Tornatore's film Baarìa – La porta del vento.

Literature
The novel The Sicilian, a fictionalized take on the life of Giuliano by Mario Puzo, depicts the massacre.

Sicilian author and playwright Beatrice Monroy wrote a poem to commemorate the tragedy, "Portella della Ginestra: Indice dei nomi proibiti" (2005). She retells the massacre from the point of view of the victims and their feelings of despair and thirst for justice, as a song of sorrow for the downtrodden of the earth, and as a crime whose instigators are still officially unknown.

See also
List of massacres in Italy
List of victims of the Sicilian Mafia

References

Sources
Ciment, James (ed.) (2015). Encyclopedia of Conflicts Since World War II, London: Routledge, 
Dickie, John (2004). Cosa Nostra. A history of the Sicilian Mafia, London: Coronet 
Hobsbawm, Eric J. (1971). Primitive rebels; studies in archaic forms of social movement in the 19th and 20th centuries, Manchester University Press, 
 Petrotta, Francesco (2010). La strage e i depistaggi: Il castello d'ombre su Portella della Ginestra, Rome: Ediesse, 
Servadio, Gaia (1976), Mafioso. A history of the Mafia from its origins to the present day, London: Secker & Warburg

External links
 1 maggio 1947, ore dieci: l’eccidio, La Sicilia, May 1, 2005
 Portella della Ginestra, La storia siamo noi (Rai Educational).

1947 murders in Italy
20th century in Sicily
20th-century mass murder in Italy
History of the Sicilian Mafia
Massacres in 1947
Massacres in Italy
May 1947 events in Europe
May Day protests
Murder in Sicily
Salvatore Giuliano